In five-dimensional geometry, a truncated 5-orthoplex is a convex uniform 5-polytope, being a truncation of the regular 5-orthoplex.

There are 4 unique truncations of the 5-orthoplex. Vertices of the truncation 5-orthoplex are located as pairs on the edge of the 5-orthoplex. Vertices of the bitruncated 5-orthoplex are located on the triangular faces of the 5-orthoplex. The third and fourth truncations are more easily constructed as second and first truncations of the 5-cube.

Truncated 5-orthoplex

Alternate names
 Truncated pentacross
 Truncated triacontaditeron (Acronym: tot) (Jonathan Bowers)

Coordinates 
Cartesian coordinates for the vertices of a truncated 5-orthoplex, centered at the origin, are all 80 vertices are sign (4) and coordinate (20) permutations of
 (±2,±1,0,0,0)

Images 
The truncated 5-orthoplex is constructed by a truncation operation applied to the 5-orthoplex. All edges are shortened, and two new vertices are added on each original edge.

Bitruncated 5-orthoplex 

The bitruncated 5-orthoplex can tessellate space in the tritruncated 5-cubic honeycomb.

Alternate names
 Bitruncated pentacross
 Bitruncated triacontiditeron (acronym: bittit) (Jonathan Bowers)

Coordinates 
Cartesian coordinates for the vertices of a truncated 5-orthoplex, centered at the origin, are all 80 vertices are sign and coordinate permutations of
 (±2,±2,±1,0,0)

Images 
The bitrunacted 5-orthoplex is constructed by a bitruncation operation applied to the 5-orthoplex.

Related polytopes

This polytope is one of 31 uniform 5-polytopes generated from the regular 5-cube or 5-orthoplex.

Notes

References
 H.S.M. Coxeter: 
 H.S.M. Coxeter, Regular Polytopes, 3rd Edition, Dover New York, 1973 
 Kaleidoscopes: Selected Writings of H.S.M. Coxeter, edited by F. Arthur Sherk, Peter McMullen, Anthony C. Thompson, Asia Ivic Weiss, Wiley-Interscience Publication, 1995,  
 (Paper 22) H.S.M. Coxeter, Regular and Semi Regular Polytopes I, [Math. Zeit. 46 (1940) 380-407, MR 2,10]
 (Paper 23) H.S.M. Coxeter, Regular and Semi-Regular Polytopes II, [Math. Zeit. 188 (1985) 559-591]
 (Paper 24) H.S.M. Coxeter, Regular and Semi-Regular Polytopes III, [Math. Zeit. 200 (1988) 3-45]
 Norman Johnson Uniform Polytopes, Manuscript (1991)
 N.W. Johnson: The Theory of Uniform Polytopes and Honeycombs, Ph.D. 
  x3x3o3o4o - tot, o3x3x3o4o - bittit

External links 
 
 Polytopes of Various Dimensions
 Multi-dimensional Glossary

5-polytopes